With God on Our Side: One Man's War Against an Evangelical Coup in America's Military is a 2006 book by Michael Weinstein, founder of the Military Religious Freedom Foundation, about what he sees as fundamentalist evangelical Christian influence in the United States Military and its institutions.  A major contention of the book is undue privilege given to the organization Christian Embassy in access to military facilities and use of military personnel in its promotions.

Separation of church and state in the United States
2006 non-fiction books
Thomas Dunne Books books